Joel Gerardo Casique (born 1958 in San Cristóbal, Venezuela; died 17 December 2010 in Caracas) was an artist who formed the Escuela Cristóbal Rojas de Caracas. He obtained an art degree at the Art Students League of New York. He has exhibited his work in galleries and museums in Venezuela, the United States, and Aruba; he has also participated in national and international fairs, including the sixteenth and seventeenth Ferias Iberoamericanas de Arte (FIA) in Caracas; the 2007 Latin American Art Fair in Miami; and the 2006 Feria Internacional de Arte de Bogotá (ARTBO) in Bogotá, Colombia.

On December 17, 2010, he was killed in his apartment in Caracas.

Exhibitions

Solo exhibitions
2008:Galería Ideobox, Miami
2003: Galería 39, Caracas, 2006;
2003: Access Art Gallery, Oranjestad, Aruba
2000: Graphic Gallery, Caracas
1997: New York Film Academy, Nueva York
1995: Gomez Gallery, Baltimore, Estados Unidos

Collective exhibitions
2007: Utopías, Galería 39, Caracas
2005: Intervención Urbana “Velada Santa Lucía”, Maracaibo, Venezuela
2005: V Bienal de Escultura, Museo de Arte Contemporáneo Francisco Narváez, Porlamar, Nueva Esparta, Venezuela
2004: “Mutaciones en el Espacio”, Museo Miranda, Los Teques, Miranda, Venezuela
2004: “Una Mirada al Lago”, Museo Lía Bermúdez, Maracaibo, Venezuela
2003: Arte venezolano del siglo XX. La megaexposición, Museo de Arte Contemporáneo de Caracas
2001: IV Bienal del Barro de América, Museo Alejandro Otero, Caracas
1999: LVII Salón de Artes Visuales Arturo Michelena, Ateneo de Valencia, Venezuela
1998: XXIII Salón Nacional de Aragua (Invitado), Museo de Arte Contemporáneo de Maracay, Venezuela,
1998: II Bienal del Paisaje, Museo de Arte Contemporáneo de Maracay, Venezuela
1997: V Bienal de Arte de Guayana donde obtiene el Primer Premio, Museo Jesús Soto, Ciudad Bolívar, Venezuela
1996: Sculpture Center, Nueva York
1995: Premio Amster Prescott, en The National Arts Club, Nueva York
1993: National Art Club, Nueva York

National and international fairs

 XVI y XVII Feria Iberoamericana de Arte. FIA, Caracas, 2007–2008;
 ArteAmericas - Latin American Art Fair, Miami, 2007;
 Feria Internacional de Arte de Bogotá ARTBO, Bogotá, 2006.

References 
Notes

General references

External links 
 

Venezuelan painters
Venezuelan sculptors
People murdered in Venezuela
1958 births
2010 deaths
2010 murders in Venezuela
Venezuelan murder victims